Justin Robert Topa (born March 7, 1991) is an American professional baseball pitcher for the Seattle Mariners of Major League Baseball (MLB).  He made his MLB debut in 2020 for the Milwaukee Brewers.

Amateur career
Topa was a four-year letter winner at Chenango Valley High School where he led his team to the Section 4 Class-B Championships in 2008 and 2009. He was named to the All-Conference team and third-team All-State squad as a pitcher while also earning All-Division as a second baseman. He was also a member of the golf, hockey and basketball teams.

Topa attended LIU Brooklyn where he finished his college baseball career with 20 wins, 200 strikeouts and 13 complete games. He was named NEC Rookie of the week three times, Louisville Slugger Player of the Week, Northeast Pitcher of the Week, and ECAC Co-Pitcher of the week honors during the 2010 season.

Career

Pittsburgh Pirates
Topa was drafted in the 17th round, 509th overall, of the 2013 Major League Baseball Draft by the Pittsburgh Pirates. He signed with the team on June 13, 2013, and made his professional debut with the Jamestown Jammers of the NY-Penn League on June 18, 2013 in relief at the Mahoning Valley Scrappers pitching one inning, allowing one hit, and striking out one. Topa finished the season with a 5–2 win–loss record and 2.19 earned run average (ERA). Topa spent 2014 with the West Virginia Power, before receiving a promotion in 2015 to the Bradenton Marauders, with whom he would play for through the 2016 season. Topa was released by the Pirates organization on April 1, 2017.

Rockland Boulders
In May 2017, Topa signed with the Rockland Boulders of the Can-Am League. He pitched in 20 games for Rockland, carrying a 3.50 ERA with 80 strikeouts over 110.2 innings pitched for the team. He began the 2018 season with Rockland as well an appeared in 4 games with the club, pitching to a 4.43 ERA with 15 strikeouts over 20.1 innings with the club.

Texas Rangers
On June 17, 2018, Topa signed a minor league contract with the Texas Rangers organization. He spent the majority of the season with the Frisco RoughRiders and also appeared with the Down East Wood Ducks before he elected free agency on November 2, 2018.

Milwaukee Brewers
On March 28, 2019, Topa signed a minor league contract with the Milwaukee Brewers organization. He spent the majority of the season with the Biloxi Shuckers and also played for the Carolina Mudcats. On July 28, 2020, the Brewers added Topa to their 60-man player pool. Topa was called up to the majors for the first time on August 31, 2020 and made his debut that night against the Detroit Tigers.  Topa relieved starting pitcher Josh Lindblom and pitched two innings allowing two runs on two hits while striking out two. On March 29, 2021, it was announced that Topa had suffered a flexor tendon strain and would miss the first half of the 2021 season. On April 6, Topa was placed on the 60-day injured list. On September 4, Topa was activated off of the injured list.

On May 30, 2022, Topa was placed on the 60-day injured list with an elbow injury.

Seattle Mariners
On January 7, 2023, the Brewers traded Topa to the Seattle Mariners for minor league pitcher Joseph Hernandez.

References

External links

1991 births
Living people
Sportspeople from Binghamton, New York
Baseball players from New York (state)
Major League Baseball pitchers
Milwaukee Brewers players
LIU Brooklyn Blackbirds baseball players
Jamestown Jammers players
West Virginia Power players
Gulf Coast Pirates players
Bradenton Marauders players
Rockland Boulders players
Down East Wood Ducks players
Frisco RoughRiders players
Carolina Mudcats players
Biloxi Shuckers players
Nashville Sounds players
Madison Mallards players